The 2011 Pendle Borough Council election took place on 5 May 2011 to elect members of Pendle Borough Council in Lancashire, England. One third of the council was up for election and the council stayed under no overall control.

After the election, the composition of the council was
Conservative 18
Labour 16
Liberal Democrats 12
British National Party 2
Independent 1

Background
Before the election there were 17 Conservatives, 16 Liberal Democrats, 13 Labour, 2 British National Party and 1 independent councillors. At the last election in 2010 the Liberal Democrats lost the leadership of the council and an agreement between the Conservative and Labour parties took control of the council, with Conservative Mike Blomeley becoming leader of the council, after attempts at forming an all party cabinet failed. However Labour withdrew from the agreement with the Conservatives in February 2011.

17 seats were contested at the election, with 6 sitting councillors standing down, Martin Bell from Craven ward, Carol Belshaw from Foulridge ward, Gary Bird from Clover Hill ward, Allan Buck from Coates ward, Sonia Robinson from Southfield ward and Violet Vaughan from Boulsworth ward.

Election result
After having run the council until the 2010 election, the Liberal Democrats fell to third on the council with 12 seats, behind the Conservatives on 18 seats and Labour on 16 seats. The Liberal Democrats lost 4 seats, Craven and Vivary Bridge to the Conservatives, and Clover Hill and Southfield to Labour, with the Liberal Democrat leader on the council John David holding his seat in Old Laund Booth by only 10 votes. Labour picked up 3 seats, taking Reedley from the Conservatives, in addition to the party's 2 gains from the Liberal Democrats, while the Conservatives ended up with 1 extra seat on the council. Overall turnout at the election was 43.7%.

Following the election, Conservative Mike Blomeley remained as leader of the council with an all Conservative cabinet, meanwhile Liberal Democrat Nadeem Ahmed became the youngest mayor of Pendle at the age of 32.

Ward results

References

2011 English local elections
2011
2010s in Lancashire